is a Japanese boxer, kickboxer and mixed martial artist currently competing in K-1 and Dream in the featherweight division.  He is known to be overly flamboyant in fights, often jeering and taunting opponents at every opportunity.

Career
Watanabe began his career in professional boxing in 2002. On October 13, 2005, he defeated Norihisa Tomimoto by unanimous decision to claim the Japanese Featherweight Championship. He defended the title twice, against Motokazu Abe and Ikuto Kobayashi, before losing it to Koji Umetsu on October 14, 2006. Watanabe retired from the sport in 2007 with a record of 15 wins (8 by knock out) and 3 losses.

On February 23, 2009, he made his kickboxing debut against Daisuke Uematsu at the K-1 World MAX 2009 Japan Tournament, losing via unanimous decision. He returned at the K-1 World MAX 2009 World Championship Tournament Final 8 on July 13 and defeated Atsushi Yamamoto via technical knockout after knocking him down three times in the first round. This would be his first and only victory in K-1 as he went on to lose his next three bouts against Cheon Jae-Hee, Daiki Hata and Kazuyuki Miyata.

He then ventured into mixed martial arts on December 31, 2010 at Dynamite!! 2010, where he was submitted with an armbar by Hideo Tokoro in the third round.

Titles
 Japanese Featherweight Boxing Champion (2005–2006, 2 defences)

Boxing record

|-
|
|Win
| Saengcharoen Mahasapcondo
|Korakuen Hall
|Tokyo, Japan
|KO
|align="center"|3
|align="center"|1:56
|15-3
| 
|-
|
|Win
| Kota Suzushino
|Korakuen Hall
|Tokyo, Japan
|Decision (unanimous)
|align="center"|8
|align="center"|3:00
|14-3
| 
|-
|
|Loss
| Koji Umetsu
|Korakuen Hall
|Tokyo, Japan
|Decision (majority)
|align="center"|10
|align="center"|3:00
|13-3
|Lost Japanese Featherweight Championship.
|-
|
|Win
| Ikuto Kobayashi
|Korakuen Hall
|Tokyo, Japan
|Decision (unanimous)
|align="center"|10
|align="center"|3:00
|12-2
|Defended Japanese Featherweight Championship.
|-
|
|Win
| Motokazu Abe
|Korakuen Hall
|Tokyo, Japan
|KO
|align="center"|1
|align="center"|1:59
|12-2
|Defended Japanese Featherweight Championship.
|-
|
|Win
| Norihisa Tomimoto
|Korakuen Hall
|Tokyo, Japan
|Decision (unanimous)
|align="center"|8
|align="center"|3:00
|11-2
|Won Japanese Featherweight Championship.
|-
|
|Win
| Runktawan Sor Vorapin
|City Gymnasium
|Akita City, Japan
|KO
|align="center"|5
|align="center"|2:57
|10-2
| 
|-
|
|Win
| Ryuta Miyagi
|Korakuen Hall
|Tokyo, Japan
|Decision (unanimous)
|align="center"|10
|align="center"|3:00
|9-2
| 
|-
|
|Win
| Raisak Porfahkamron
|Korakuen Hall
|Tokyo, Japan
|KO
|align="center"|1
|align="center"|1:42
|8-2
| 
|-
|
|Win
| Atsushi Tsuburaya
|Korakuen Hall
|Tokyo, Japan
|Decision (unanimous)
|align="center"|8
|align="center"|3:00
|7-2
| 
|-
|
|Win
| Kenichi Nakayama
|Kose Sports Park
|Kōfu, Japan
|TKO
|align="center"|6
|align="center"|2:52
|6-2
| 
|-
|
|Win
| Yosuke Tsuda
|Korakuen Hall
|Tokyo, Japan
|Decision (unanimous)
|align="center"|6
|align="center"|3:00
|5-2
| 
|-
|
|Win
| Hajime Tanaka
|Korakuen Hall
|Tokyo, Japan
|Decision (unanimous)
|align="center"|4
|align="center"|3:00
|4-2
| 
|-
|
|Loss
| Atsushi Sakurai
|Korakuen Hall
|Tokyo, Japan
|KO
|align="center"|1
|align="center"|0:43
|3-2
| 
|-
|
|Win
| Shinya Saito
|Korakuen Hall
|Tokyo, Japan
|KO
|align="center"|1
|align="center"|2:37
|3-1
| 
|-
|
|Win
| Tatsuya Yokoyama
|Korakuen Hall
|Tokyo, Japan
|KO
|align="center"|1
|align="center"|1:55
|2-1
| 
|-
|
|Loss
| Atsushi Sakurai
|Korakuen Hall
|Tokyo, Japan
|KO
|align="center"|3
|align="center"|0:31
|1-1
| 
|-
|
|Win
| Ken Komuro
|Korakuen Hall
|Tokyo, Japan
|KO
|align="center"|1
|align="center"|2:30
|1-0
| 
|-
|-
| colspan=9 | Legend:

Kickboxing record

|-
|
|Loss
| Kazuyuki Miyata
|K-1 World MAX 2010 -70kg Tournament Final 16 -63kg Japan Tournament Final
|Tokyo, Japan
|Decision (unanimous)
|align="center"|3
|align="center"|3:00
|1-4
| 
|-
|
|Loss
| Daiki Hata
|K-1 World MAX 2010 –70 kg Japan Tournament
|Saitama, Japan
|Decision (unanimous)
|align="center"|3
|align="center"|3:00
|1-3
| 
|-
|
|Loss
| Cheon Jae-Hee
|K-1 World MAX 2009 World Championship Tournament Final
|Yokohama, Japan
|Decision (split)
|align="center"|3
|align="center"|3:00
|1-2
| 
|-
|
|Win
| Atsushi Yamamoto
|K-1 World MAX 2009 World Championship Tournament Final 8
|Tokyo, Japan
|TKO (3 knockdowns)
|align="center"|1
|align="center"|2:40
|1-1
| 
|-
|
|Loss
| Daisuke Uematsu
|K-1 World MAX 2009 Japan Tournament
|Tokyo, Japan
|Decision (unanimous)
|align="center"|3
|align="center"|3:00
|0-1
| 
|-
|-
| colspan=10 | Legend:

Mixed martial arts record

|-
|Loss
|align=center|0-1
| Hideo Tokoro
|Submission (armbar)
|Dynamite!! 2010
|
|align=center|3
|align=center|2:50
|Saitama, Saitama, Japan
|

References

External links

Sherdog profile
K-1 profile
Boxrec profile

Japanese male boxers
Featherweight boxers
Japanese male mixed martial artists
Featherweight mixed martial artists
Mixed martial artists utilizing boxing
Mixed martial artists utilizing kickboxing
Japanese male kickboxers
Lightweight kickboxers
Living people
Sportspeople from Yamanashi Prefecture
Super-featherweight boxers
Welterweight kickboxers
1983 births